Betty Merken is an American painter and printmaker who lives and works in Seattle, Washington.

Merken's abstract geometric monotypes and paintings recall the early Modernist works of Piet Mondrian and often echo freedoms of painterly gesture pioneered by the Abstract Expressionists.

Her work can be found in several galleries and in numerous private and public collections in the United States, Asia, and Europe, and in the permanent collections of several major museums, including the Fine Arts Museums of San Francisco (The de Young Museum and the California Palace of the Legion of Honor), the UCLA Hammer Museum in Los Angeles, and the Portland Art Museum in Portland, Oregon.

Merken has been honored with fellowships from the BAU Institute in Otranto, Italy and New York, and from the Civita Institute for Architecture and Urban Studies in Italy (formerly Northwest Institute for Architecture and Urban Studies in Italy). She is the co-author, with Stefan Merken, of Wall Art, Megamurals and Supergraphics (Philadelphia: Running Press, 1987).

Notes

References
 "Betty Merken: Gravity and Whispers." Laura Russo Gallery, Portland, OR. Review by Richard Speer, "ArtLtd," September/October issue, 2014.
 "The Art Scene", Lakeville Journal, Lakeville, CT, Reviews by Elise Huston and Leon Graham, 2009.
 Artweek Magazine. Review by contributing editor Debra Koppman, Oakland, CA. 2006.
 California Home and Design Magazine, January, 2005.
 7 x 7 San Francisco Magazine, "Collecting Art", p. 123. November, 2005.
 "A Common Language".  Group Exhibition, Institute of Contemporary Art, Shenzhen, China. Full color catalogue.
 "Twelve on Twelve". Catalogue essay by Robert Flynn Johnson, Chief Curator of Prints and Drawings, Achenbach Foundation for Graphic Arts, Fine Arts Museums of San Francisco, to accompany limited edition monotype portfolio. 2004.
 "17th National Exhibition", Los Angeles Printmaking Society.  Catalogue essay by Kevin Salatino, Senior Curator of Prints and Drawings, Los Angeles County Museum of Art. 2003.
 The Art Collector's Resource Catalogue, published by Art on Paper magazine. 2003.
 Artweek Magazine.  Review by contributing editor Ron Glowen, January, 2000.

External links
 

American contemporary painters
21st-century American painters
Living people
Artists from Seattle
Painters from Washington (state)
20th-century American painters
20th-century American printmakers
American women painters
20th-century American women artists
21st-century American women artists
Year of birth missing (living people)
American women printmakers